Baroness Bertha von Arnswaldt, born 'Holland', (February 3, 1850 in London - 12 July 1919 in Berlin) was a Berlin salonière.

She belonged to a famous family - so for example 'August von Arnswald' who was a friend of the poet Annette von Droste-Hülshoff, or Bernhard von Arnswald, who was a Commanding officer on the castle Wartburg.

Her husband was Hermann von Arnswaldt (1841–1910), a member of the 'Reichstag'.

Before this she married Karl Louis Andreae (1839–1878) - he was the father of her son Fritz Andreae, who married Edith Rathenau.

Many habitués visited the house at Nollendorfplatz 7th, because it was considered as the most important Berliner Salon in the years immediately before the outbreak of world war in 1914.

The specialty was in the unfamiliar social diversity of its audience: Both representatives of the rich bourgeoisie, the economic capital's and Prussian nobility, as well as writers of early modernism found their way into the house of the Baroness.

References

1850 births
1919 deaths
People from Berlin
German socialites
British emigrants to Germany